Gan Tingting (born 5 February 1986), also known as Bobo Gan, is a Chinese actress.

Gan is noted for her performance in the Vietnam-China movie Hanoi, Hanoi, for which she won Best Actress award at the Golden Kite Awards. She is also known for the television series All Men Are Brothers (2011), New Treasure Raider (2016) and General and I (2017).

Early life and education
Gan was born and raised in Wuhu, Anhui. She graduated from Central Academy of Drama, majoring in acting.

Acting career
Gan made her acting debut in Founding Emperor of Ming Dynasty, a historical television series based on the life of Hongwu Emperor.

In 2006, Gan won the Best Actress Award at the Golden Kite International Film Festival for her performance in the film Hanoi, Hanoi.

Gan rose to prominence in China for her role in All Men Are Brothers (2012), a wuxia television series based on the novel Water Margin which was highly rated in China.

In 2013, Gan starred in the historical television series Heroes in Sui and Tang Dynasties, and received positive reviews for her performance.

In 2016, Gan starred in New Treasure Raider, based on the novel, based on Gu Long's wuxia novel. She received the Best Supporting Actress award at the 3rd Hengdian Film and TV Festival of China.

In 2017, Gan starred in the historical romance drama General and I.

Filmography

Film

Television series

Awards and nominations

References

External links

 

1986 births
People from Wuhu
Living people
Actresses from Anhui
Central Academy of Drama alumni
Chinese film actresses
Chinese television actresses
21st-century Chinese actresses